Shuangmiao Township is a township of Da County in northeastern Sichuan province, China, located about  south-southwest of downtown Dazhou. , it has 2 residential communities (社区) and 20 villages under its administration.

References 

Township-level divisions of Sichuan